Archontophoenix is a plant genus comprising six palm species that are native to New South Wales and Queensland in eastern Australia. They are tall, slender and unbranched. Relationships between Archontophoenix and the other genera of subtribe Archontophoenicinae, including the New Caledonia endemic Actinokentia, Chambeyronia and Kentiopsis are unresolved.

Species include:

Archontophoenix alexandrae (F.Muell.) H.Wendl. & Drude - Alexandra palm, king palm 
Archontophoenix cunninghamiana H.Wendl. & Drude - Bangalow palm, piccabeen palm 
Archontophoenix maxima Dowe  
Archontophoenix myolensis Dowe 
Archontophoenix purpurea Hodel & Dowe - Mount Lewis king palm 
Archontophoenix tuckeri Dowe

Classification
Subfamily: Arecoideae; Tribe: Areceae; Subtribe: Archontophoenicinae. There are four other genera in the subtribe Archontophoenicinae, namely Actinokentia, Actinorhytis, Chambeyronia, Kentiopsis.

References

External links
Palm & Cycad Society of Australia: Archontophoenix
Jones, D.L. 1995. Palms Throughout the World, Reed Books, Australia.
Archontophoenix Australian Plant Name Index, Centre for Plant Biodiversity Research, Australian Government
 PlantNET: New South Wales Flora Online: Genus Archontophoenix

 
Arecaceae genera
Palms of Australia
Taxa named by Carl Georg Oscar Drude

hu:Királypálma